Olga Kremleva (or Kremlyova) is a Russian former football midfielder who played for Sibiryachka Krasnoyarsk, CSK VVS Samara, Lada Togliatti and Rossiyanka in the Russian Championship, taking part in the UEFA Women's Cup with all but the first one. She was a member of the Russian national team, playing the 2001 European Championship.

References

1974 births
Living people
Russian women's footballers
Women's association football midfielders
CSK VVS Samara (women's football club) players
FC Lada Togliatti (women) players
WFC Rossiyanka players
21st-century Russian women